The Town of Carbonate is a ghost town located in Garfield County, Colorado, United States. In 2014, property owners voted to reactivate the town government despite having no year-round residents since 1890.

History
Carbonate was founded as a silver camp in 1879. The Town of Carbonate incorporated on April 13, 1883. The Carbonate post office opened and Carbonate became the original Garfield county seat later that year. But Carbonate's location high in the Flat Tops mountains made access difficult. After a few months, the Garfield county seat was moved to Glenwood Hot Springs. As the silver played out, miners departed. The Carbonate post office closed in 1886, and by the 1890 United States Census, no residents remained.

On November 4, 2014, Carbonate property owners voted 9 to 0 to reactivate the town's government in hopes of future development. The town has summer visitors but no permanent residents, making it the only active incorporated municipality in Colorado with no permanent population.

Geography

At the 2020 United States Census, the town had a total area of  including  of water.

Demographics
Carbonate has been continuously uninhabited since the 1890 United States Census.

See also

Colorado
Bibliography of Colorado
Index of Colorado-related articles
Outline of Colorado
List of counties in Colorado
List of municipalities in Colorado
List of places in Colorado
List of statistical areas in Colorado
Edwards-Glenwood Springs, CO Combined Statistical Area
Glenwood Springs, CO Micropolitan Statistical Area

References

External links
Town of Carbonate website
Plat map of the Town of Carbonate

Towns in Garfield County, Colorado
Towns in Colorado
1879 establishments in Colorado
1883 establishments in Colorado
2014 establishments in Colorado
Former county seats in Colorado